Greg Edwards may refer to:

 Greg Edwards (musician), American musician and songwriter
 Greg Edwards (DJ) (born 1947), American-born British Disc Jockey
 Greg Edwards, presenter of Thug Notes in the persona of "Sparky Sweets, PhD"

See also